The Friedrichshafen–Lindau railway is a single-track main-line railway in Southern Germany, that has been electrified since December 2021. The 22.575 kilometre-long line runs consistently on the north shore of Lake Constance (Bodensee), with the western part lying in Bodenseekreis and the eastern part in the district of Lindau.

History
Friedrichshafen was connected to the rail network via the Württemberg Southern Railway (Württembergische Südbahn) in 1847 and Lindau was connected via the Ludwig South-North Railway (Ludwig-Süd-Nord-Bahn) in 1853, but the gap between the two towns was not closed by the Royal Württemberg State Railways and the Royal Bavarian State Railways until 1 October 1899. The entrance buildings at the Bavarian end of the line were built in the architectural style of the Württemberg railways. A 78 metre-long steel bridge was built over the Argen between Langenargen and Kressbronn by Maschinenfabrik Esslingen and has been placed under monument protection. It was replaced by a new steel bridge in 2019 in preparation for the electrification of the line.
 
A new platform was built at Nonnenhorn station and the main platform was modernised in 2021.

Operations
The whole line has been integrated into the Bodensee-Oberschwaben Verkehrsverbund (Bodensee-Oberschwaben Transport Association, branded bodo) since 1 January 2018 and is mainly served by local passenger services, usually running twice an hour in each direction.
 
One to two pairs of freight trains run daily, pulled by a class 232 or a class 247 locomotive.
 
The line is equipped with the GSM-R communications system and the Geschwindigkeitsüberwachung Neigetechnik (ZUB 262) train control system.

Gallery

References

Footnotes

Sources
 

Railway lines in Baden-Württemberg
Railway lines in Bavaria
Railway lines opened in 1895
1895 establishments in Germany
Buildings and structures in Lindau (district)
Buildings and structures in Bodenseekreis